Cryspovirus is a genus of viruses, in the family Partitiviridae. Protists serve as natural hosts. There is only one species in this genus: Cryptosporidium parvum virus 1.

Structure
Viruses in Cryspovirus are non-enveloped, with icosahedral geometries, and T=1 symmetry. The diameter is around 30-35 nm. Genomes are linear and segmented, around 2.1kb in length. The genome codes for 2 proteins.

Life cycle
Viral replication is cytoplasmic. Entry into the host cell is achieved by penetration into the host cell. Replication follows the double-stranded RNA virus replication model. Double-stranded RNA virus transcription is the method of transcription. Protists serve as the natural host.

References

External links
 ICTV Online Report Partitiviridae
 Viralzone: Cryspovirus

Partitiviridae
Virus genera